The Untamed Breed is a 1948 American Western film directed by Charles Lamont and starring Sonny Tufts, Barbara Britton and George 'Gabby' Hayes.

Plot
A couple are brought together in the hunt for a bull that has escaped in the Pecos cattle country.

Cast
 Sonny Tufts as Tom Kilpatrick
 Barbara Britton as Cherry Lucas
 George "Gabby" Hayes as Windy Lucas
 Edgar Buchanan as John Rambeau
 William Bishop as Larch Keegan
 George E. Stone as Pablo
 Joe Sawyer as Hoy Keegan
 Gordon Jones as Happy Keegan

See also
 List of American films of 1948

References

External links
 
 
 

1948 films
American Western (genre) films
1948 Western (genre) films
Films directed by Charles Lamont
Films scored by George Duning
Columbia Pictures films
1940s English-language films
1940s American films